The 2013 Berlin Marathon was the 40th edition of the Berlin Marathon, held in Berlin, Germany. It took place on Sunday, 29 September. The race was sponsored by BMW, being officially titled the BMW Berlin Marathon.

The men's race was won by Wilson Kipsang of Kenya in a world record time of 2:03:23.

The women's race was won by Florence Kiplagat of Kenya in a time of 2:21:13.

The 20th-place finisher in the men's race, Miguel Ángel Gamonal, tested positive for Clenbuterol and was disqualified and banned for two years.

Although Kipsang's world record was obviously the major historical event of the race, it later became notable for being Eliud Kipchoge's only loss at the marathon distance in an otherwise spotless competitive record spanning 2013 to 2019. His next loss would not occur until the 2020 London Marathon.

Results

Men

Women

References

External links
Official website

Berlin Marathon
Berlin
Berlin Marathon
2013 in Berlin